Roman Valentinovich Gapotiy (born 15 February 1970) is a former Russian football player.

External links
 

1970 births
Living people
Soviet footballers
FC SKA Rostov-on-Don players
FC APK Morozovsk players
Russian footballers
PFC Krylia Sovetov Samara players
Russian Premier League players
Association football midfielders